NA-39 Bannu is a constituency for the National Assembly of Pakistan. It covers the whole of district Bannu. The constituency was formerly known as NA-26 Bannu from 1977 to 2018. The name changed to NA-35 Bannu after the delimitation in 2018.

Members of Parliament

1977–2002: NA-26 Bannu

2002–2018: NA-26 Bannu

2018-2022: NA-35 Bannu

Elections since 2002

2002 general election

A total of 2,106 votes were rejected.

2008 general election

A total of 2,792 votes were rejected.

2013 general election

A total of 5,300 votes were rejected.

2018 general election 

General elections were held on 25 July 2018. Chairman Pakistan Tehreek-e-Insaf, Imran Khan won the election but vacated this constituency and three others in favor of NA-95 (Mianwali-I).

By-election 2018

By-elections were held in this constituency on 14 October 2018.

See also
NA-38 Karak
NA-40 North Waziristan

References

External links 
 Election result's official website

35
35